István Osztrics (born 25 December 1949) is a Hungarian fencer. He won a gold medal in the team épée event at the 1972 Summer Olympics.

References

External links
 

1949 births
Living people
Hungarian male épée fencers
Olympic fencers of Hungary
Fencers at the 1972 Summer Olympics
Fencers at the 1976 Summer Olympics
Fencers at the 1980 Summer Olympics
Olympic gold medalists for Hungary
Olympic medalists in fencing
Martial artists from Budapest
Medalists at the 1972 Summer Olympics
Universiade medalists in fencing
Universiade bronze medalists for Hungary
Medalists at the 1970 Summer Universiade
Medalists at the 1973 Summer Universiade